Federico Silva Muñoz (28 October 1923 – 12 August 1997) was a Spanish politician who served as Minister of Public Works of Spain between 1965 and 1970, during the Francoist dictatorship.

References

1923 births
1997 deaths
Public works ministers of Spain
Government ministers during the Francoist dictatorship